JS Narushio (SS-595) is the sixth boat of the s. She was commissioned on 3 March 2003.

Construction and career
Narushio was laid down at Mitsubishi Heavy Industries Kobe Shipyard on 2 April 1999 and launched on 4 October 2001. She was commissioned on 3 March 2003 and deployed to Yokosuka.

The vessel participated in the major naval exercises RIMPAC 2004 and RIMPAC 2008.

Gallery

Citations

External links

2001 ships
Oyashio-class submarines
Ships built by Mitsubishi Heavy Industries